Jovina Bei Fen Choo (born February 10, 1990) is a Singaporean sailor. She and Amanda Ng placed 20th in the women's 470 event at the 2016 Summer Olympics.

References

External links
 

1990 births
Living people
Singaporean female sailors (sport)
Olympic sailors of Singapore
Sailors at the 2016 Summer Olympics – 470
Southeast Asian Games silver medalists for Singapore
Southeast Asian Games medalists in sailing
Competitors at the 2007 Southeast Asian Games
21st-century Singaporean women